Swingate Mill is a Grade II listed tower mill in Guston, Kent, England that was built in 1849.

History

Swingate Mill was built for John Mummery in 1849, incorporating the cap, sails, windshaft and brake wheel from a windmill that had been intended to be erected on the Rope Walk, Dover, but which was not built owing to fears that it would not function properly at the proposed site. The mill was working by wind until 1943, when the sails were damaged by enemy fire. A new pair of sails were fitted in 1947, but the mill was tail-winded in 1959 and lost its cap and sails.

Description

Swingate Mill is a four-storey brick tower mill with a Kentish-style cap. It had four patent sails carried on a cast-iron windshaft. The mill was winded by a fantail. There was a stage at first-floor level. The mill drove three pairs of millstones underdrift and all the machinery was cast iron.

Millers

John Mummery 1849 - 1907
Ebeneezer A Mummery 1907 - 1918
George Sheaff 1922 - 1930
Thompsett 1930 - 1947

References for above:-

References

External links
Windmill World page on the mill.

Windmills in Kent
Grinding mills in the United Kingdom
Tower mills in the United Kingdom
Grade II listed buildings in Kent
Windmills completed in 1849
1849 establishments in England